Teddy Richert (born 21 September 1974) is a French goalkeeper coach, currently working for Montpellier, and former football goalkeeper.

Richert spent the most of his career at Sochaux-Montbéliard and was considered to be one of the most consistent goalkeepers in Ligue 1, and has performed well over the past decade. Opportunities for international football for Richert were few and far between, due to Domenech's preference of Grégory Coupet and, in the latter part of the decade, Fabien Barthez.

While at Sochaux he helped them win the 2004 Coupe de la Ligue Final and the 2007 Coupe de France Final. Both matches went to a penalty shootout and Richert saved decisive penalties on each occasion; first from Nantes' Pascal Delhommeau in 2004 and then from Marseille's Ronald Zubar in 2007.

Honours

Club
Sochaux
Coupe de la Ligue: 2004
Coupe de France: 2007

Individual
French League 1 Goalkeeper of the Year: 2007

References

External links
 

Living people
1974 births
Sportspeople from Avignon
Association football goalkeepers
French footballers
Toulouse FC players
FC Girondins de Bordeaux players
Lille OSC players
FC Sochaux-Montbéliard players
Ligue 1 players
Ligue 2 players